Al-Ghaib is an Arabic expression used to convey that something is concealed (unseen). It is an important concept in Islam, encompassing not only the realm of the divine, including angels, paradise, and hell, but also future events, which only God knows. Jinn (daemons), who are also generally invisible but bound to earthly lives, are thought be restricted from the unseen as humans are.

In the Quran it has 6 forms and 3 meanings. But it can also be used in a general sense to refer to something that is known to some but concealed from others.

Meaning
In Arabic, al-Ghaib refers to anything that is hidden in some manner. The term is composed of two words (a definitive article and an adjective), "al" and "Ghaib", literally translating to "the" and "unseen" respectively. It possesses multiple intricate meanings stemming out from the figurative translation "the depth of the well." Given that the bottom of the well is visually concealed as a result of its depth, its contents are generally undeterminable. Al-Ghaib therefore refers to that which is absent, hidden, or concealed.  Like majority of adjectives in the Arabic language, al-Ghaib has a triliteral or triconsonantal root. It is composed of three root letters غ ي ب (gaain, yaa, baa), roughly tantamount to g-y-b respectively in the English language.

In Islam
In the Islamic context, al-Ghaib refers to transcendental or divine secrets. It is mentioned in sixty different places in the Qur'an, in six different forms. It has three primary meanings:
 Absent – "That is so al-'Azeez will know that I did not betray him in [his] absence and that Allah does not guide the plan of betrayers."   (12:52)
 The Unknown or Hidden – "[Allah is] Knower of the unseen and the witnessed, the Grand, the Exalted."  (13:9) 
 The Future – "Say, "I hold not for myself [the power of] benefit or harm, except what Allah has willed. And if I knew the unseen, I could have acquired much wealth, and no harm would have touched me. I am not except a warner and a bringer of good tidings to a people who believe." "   (7:188)

Types
There are two types of Ghaib:
 
1.  Al-Ghaib al-Mutlaq (الغيب المطلق) - Absolute Ghaib refers to all knowledge that is unseen or concealed and is only known to Allah.  As stated in the Quran: "And with Him are the keys of the Ghayb (all that is hidden), none knows them but He…"   (6:59)   
  
Examples of this form of Ghaib are illustrated in the narrations of Muhammad: It is narrated that Abdullah bin `Umar said that the Messenger of Allah said, "The Keys of the Ghaib (unseen knowledge) are five, nobody knows them but Allah. Nobody knows what will happen tomorrow except Allah; nobody knows what is in the womb except Allah; nobody knows when it will rain except Allah; no soul knows at what place he will die except Allah; and nobody knows when the (Final) Hour will begin except Allah.) 
 
2.  Al-Ghaib al-Nisbi (الغيب النسبي) - Relative Ghaib is proportionate to an individual and their situation; hence it is apparent to some while hidden from others. An example to illustrate this notion is that of a class in which the students can see the lecturer, hear the content of the lecture, and the conversations that take place in the classroom, while those outside are unaware of the occurrences in the classroom.

Belief in al-Ghaib
It is a fundamental constituent in a Muslim’s belief system to believe in the unseen. As illustrated in the Quran numerous times: "... it [theQuran] is guidance for the righteous… for those who believe in the unseen" (2:3-4). These verses are mentioned at the beginning of the Quran as core characteristics of a believer and consequently all six articles of faith are based on this notion of "the unseen". The six articles of faith in Islam are:
Belief in God
Belief in the Angels
Belief in Divine Books
Belief in the Prophets
Belief in the Day of Judgment
Belief in God's predestination
As stated in a narration ascribed to Muhammad

Examples in Islamic texts
In Islamic context, (al-)Ghaib (غيب) is (the) unseen and unknown, in reference to God (allah) and the forces that shape the world. The Quran states that man (mankind) is unable to see God and his attributes. Belief in al-Ghaib is considered an important Muslim characteristic, as it allows for prayer and faith.

He said, "Did I not tell you that I know the unseen [aspects] of the heavens and the earth? And I know what you reveal and what you have concealed." (2:33) 

Say, [O Muhammad], "I do not tell you that I have the depositories [containing the provision] of God or that I know the unseen, nor do I tell you that I am an angel. I only follow what is revealed to me. (6:50) 

And with Him are the keys of the unseen; none knows them except Him. And He knows what is on the land and in the sea. Not a leaf falls but that He knows it. And no grain is there within the darknesses of the earth and no moist or dry [thing] but that it is [written] in the clear book. (6:59)

References

Islamic theology
Quranic words and phrases